Kundy is a rural locality (a selo) and the administrative centre of Kundynsky Selsoviet, Laksky District, Republic of Dagestan, Russia. The population was 815 as of 2010. There are 5 streets.

Geography 
Kundy is located 19 km northeast of Kumukh (the district's administrative centre) by road. Kuma and Kara are the nearest rural localities.

Nationalities 
Laks live there.

References 

Rural localities in Laksky District